Brett Sickler (born March 19, 1983 in Cupertino, California) is an American rower. Sickler is a three-time member of the US rowing senior national team and won gold medals with the women's eight at the 2006 and 2007 World Rowing Championships. She finished 12th in the women's double sculls at the 2006 world regatta and was a Team USA alternate for the 2008 Beijing Olympic Games. Sickler graduated from the University of Michigan in 2005 and was the lead assistant coach from 2010–2012 where she helped coach the Wolverines to a second-place finish at the 2012 NCAA Championships and the 2012 Big Ten Championship title. She was named the assistant coach for the University of Virginia rowing team in August 2012.

References 
 

1983 births
Living people
American female rowers
University of Michigan people
University of Michigan alumni
World Rowing Championships medalists for the United States
21st-century American women